Of the 11 North Carolina incumbents, 8 were re-elected.

See also 
 List of United States representatives from North Carolina
 United States House of Representatives elections, 1972

1972
North Carolina
1972 North Carolina elections